Table Grove is a village in Fulton County, Illinois,  United States. Its population was 416 as of the 2010 census.

Geography
Table Grove is located in western Fulton County at  (40.365492, -90.425598). U.S. Route 136 passes through the center of the village, leading east  to Havana and northwest  to Macomb.

Demographics

As of the census of 2000, there were 396 people, 169 households, and 113 families residing in the village. The racial makeup of the village was 99.49% White, 0.25% from other races, and 0.25% from two or more races.

There were 169 households, out of which 27.2% had children under the age of 18 living with them, 55.0% were married couples living together, 8.3% had a female householder with no husband present, and 33.1% were non-families. 28.4% of all households were made up of individuals, and 17.8% had someone living alone who was 65 years of age or older.  The average household size was 2.34 and the average family size was 2.88.

In the village, the population was spread out, with 23.5% under the age of 18, 6.8% from 18 to 24, 26.5% from 25 to 44, 22.0% from 45 to 64, and 21.2% who were 65 years of age or older.  The median age was 41 years. For every 100 females, there were 91.3 males.  For every 100 females age 18 and over, there were 87.0 males.

The median income for a household in the village was $37,750, and the median income for a family was $46,071. Males had a median income of $32,292 versus $19,444 for females. The per capita income for the village was $17,877.  About 8.1% of families and 12.7% of the population were below the poverty line, including 28.1% of those under age 18 and 2.3% of those age 65 or over.

References

Villages in Fulton County, Illinois
Villages in Illinois